Baldwinsville Village Hall, in Baldwinsville, New York is a Renaissance Revival style village hall that was listed in the National Register of Historic Places in 1997.  It was designed by architect Charles E. Colton and was built by G.W. Van Dusen and others in 1897.

References

City and town halls on the National Register of Historic Places in New York (state)
Buildings and structures in Onondaga County, New York
Village halls in the United States
National Register of Historic Places in Onondaga County, New York